The Colorado Rockies' 2003 season was the 11th for the Rockies attempting to win the National League West. Clint Hurdle was the manager. They played home games at Coors Field. They finished with a record of 74-88, 4th in the NL West.

Offseason
November 16, 2002: Mike Hampton was traded by the Colorado Rockies with Juan Pierre and cash to the Florida Marlins for Charles Johnson, Preston Wilson, Pablo Ozuna, and Vic Darensbourg.
January 8, 2003: Chris Stynes was signed as a free agent by the Colorado Rockies.
January 23, 2003: Steve Reed was signed as a free agent by the Colorado Rockies.
January 24, 2003: José Hernández and Mark Sweeney were signed as free agents by the Colorado Rockies.
February 3, 2003: Darren Oliver was signed as a free agent by the Colorado Rockies.
March 21, 2003: Jack Cust was traded by the Colorado Rockies to the Baltimore Orioles for Chris Richard.

Regular season

Season standings

National League West

Record vs. opponents

Notable transactions
April 9, 2003: Greg Vaughn was signed as a free agent by the Colorado Rockies.
June 3, 2003: Ian Stewart was drafted by the Colorado Rockies in the 1st round of the 2003 amateur draft. Player signed June 11, 2003.
June 20, 2003: José Hernández was traded by the Colorado Rockies to the Chicago Cubs for Mark Bellhorn.
June 28, 2003: Gabe Kapler was purchased by the Boston Red Sox from the Colorado Rockies.
July 13, 2003: Ben Petrick was traded by the Colorado Rockies to the Detroit Tigers for Adam Bernero.
August 26, 2003: Gregg Zaun was signed as a free agent by the Colorado Rockies.

Major League debuts
Batters:
René Reyes (Jul 22)
Garrett Atkins (Aug 3)
Clint Barmes (Sep 5)
Pitchers:
Javier López (Apr 1)
Jason Young (May 12)
Matt Miller (Jun 27)
Chin-hui Tsao (Jul 25)

Roster

Game log 

|-  bgcolor="ffbbbb"
|- align="center" bgcolor="ffbbbb"
| 1 || April 1 || @ Astros || 10–4 || Oswalt (1–0) || Jennings (0–1) || || 43,241 || 0–1
|- align="center" bgcolor="ffbbbb"
| 2 || April 2 || @ Astros || 8–7 || Wagner (1–0) || Jiménez (0–1) || || 21,082 || 0–2
|- align="center" bgcolor="bbffbb"
| 3 || April 3 || @ Astros || 10–5 || Cruz (1–0) || Robertson (0–1) || || 21,171 || 1–2
|- align="center" bgcolor="bbffbb"
| 4 || April 4 || Diamondbacks || 2–1 || Chacón (1–0) || Kim (0–1) || Jiménez (1) || 48,087 || 2–2
|- align="center" bgcolor="bbffbb"
| 5 || April 5 || Diamondbacks || 4–3 (10) || Reed (1–0) || Batista (0–1) || || 25,197 || 3–2
|- align="center" bgcolor="bbffbb"
| 6 || April 6 || Diamondbacks || 8–3 || Jennings (1–1) || Schilling (0–1) || || 25,443 || 4–2
|- align="center" bgcolor="ffbbbb"
| 7 || April 8 || Cardinals || 15–12 (13) || Eldred (1–0) || Miceli (0–1) || || 21,563 || 4–3
|- align="center" bgcolor="bbffbb"
| 8 || April 9 || Cardinals || 9–4 || Cruz (2–0) || Tomko (0–1) || || 24,110 || 5–3
|- align="center" bgcolor="bbffbb"
| 9 || April 10 || Cardinals || 7–6 || López (1–0) || Kline (0–1) || Jiménez (2) || 24,586 || 6–3
|- align="center" bgcolor="ffbbbb"
| 10 || April 11 || @ Padres || 6–4 || Lawrence (2–0) || Oliver (0–1) || Villafuerte (2) || 21,190 || 6–4
|- align="center" bgcolor="bbffbb"
| 11 || April 12 || @ Padres || 3–2 || Speier (1–0) || Villafuerte (0–1) || Jiménez (3) || 30,830 || 7–4
|- align="center" bgcolor="ffbbbb"
| 12 || April 13 || @ Padres || 6–2 || Wright (1–1) || Cook (0–1) || || 20,316 || 7–5
|- align="center" bgcolor="bbffbb"
| 13 || April 14 || @ Diamondbacks || 5–3 || Cruz (3–0) || Kim (0–3) || Jiménez (4) || 25,688 || 8–5
|- align="center" bgcolor="bbffbb"
| 14 || April 15 || @ Diamondbacks || 12–1 || Chacón (2–0) || Patterson (0–1) || || 31,182 || 9–5
|- align="center" bgcolor="ffbbbb"
| 15 || April 16 || @ Diamondbacks || 4–3 || Mantei (3–0) || Jiménez (0–2) || || 28,588 || 9–6
|- align="center" bgcolor="ffbbbb"
| 16 || April 17 || @ Diamondbacks || 11–2 || Schilling (1–2) || Jennings (1–2) || || 32,507 || 9–7
|- align="center" bgcolor="bbffbb"
| 17 || April 18 || Padres || 12–1 || Cook (1–1) || Pérez (0–2) || || 27,609 || 10–7
|- align="center" bgcolor="bbffbb"
| 18 || April 19 || Padres || 10–9 || Reed (2–0) || Villafuerte (0–2) || || 27,031 || 11–7
|- align="center" bgcolor="bbffbb"
| 19 || April 20 || Padres || 8–0 || Chacón (3–0) || Peavy (3–1) || || 28,005 || 12–7
|- align="center" bgcolor="ffbbbb"
| 20 || April 22 || @ Phillies || 5–2 || Millwood (3–1) || Oliver (0–2) || Mesa (4) || 13,431 || 12–8
|- align="center" bgcolor="ffbbbb"
| 21 || April 23 || @ Phillies || 6–4 || Myers (1–2) || Jennings (1–3) || Mesa (5) || 13,444 || 12–9
|- align="center" bgcolor="ffbbbb"
| 22 || April 24 || @ Phillies || 9–1 || Wolf (3–1) || Cook (1–2) || || 16,947 || 12–10
|- align="center" bgcolor="ffbbbb"
| 23 || April 25 || Cubs || 11–7 || Prior (4–1) || Cruz (3–1) || || 32,162 || 12–11
|- align="center" bgcolor="bbffbb"
| 24 || April 26 || Cubs || 8–5 || Chacón (4–0) || Estes (1–3) || Jiménez (5) || 35,604 || 13–11
|- align="center" bgcolor="bbffbb"
| 25 || April 27 || Cubs || 6–3 || Oliver (1–2) || Zambrano (3–2) || Jiménez (6) || 35,070 || 14–11
|- align="center" bgcolor="bbffbb"
| 26 || April 29 || Reds || 10–5 || Jennings (2–3) || Reitsma (1–1) || || 26,206 || 15–11
|- align="center" bgcolor="ffbbbb"
| 27 || April 30 || Reds || 13–11 || Sullivan (2–0) || Miceli (0–2) || Williamson (6) || 26,436 || 15–12
|-

|-  bgcolor="ffbbbb"
|- align="center" bgcolor="ffbbbb"
| 28 || May 1 || Reds || 7–2 || Austin (1–1) || Cruz (3–2) || || 28,788 || 15–13
|- align="center" bgcolor="ffbbbb"
| 29 || May 2 || @ Cubs || 7–4 || Estes (2–3) || Chacón (4–1) || Borowski (5) || 29,236 || 15–14
|- align="center" bgcolor="bbffbb"
| 30 || May 3 || @ Cubs || 6–4 || Speier (2–0) || Guthrie (0–2) || Jiménez (7) || 38,332 || 16–14
|- align="center" bgcolor="ffbbbb"
| 31 || May 4 || @ Cubs || 5–4 (10) || Borowski (1–0) || Reed (2–1) || || 37,223 || 16–15
|- align="center" bgcolor="ffbbbb"
| 32 || May 6 || @ Braves || 3–2 || Hernández (3–0) || Jones (0–1) || Smoltz (13) || 18,108 || 16–16
|- align="center" bgcolor="ffbbbb"
| 33 || May 8 || @ Braves || 12–6 || Reynolds (2–1) || Cruz (3–3) || Smoltz (14) || || 16–17
|- align="center" bgcolor="ffbbbb"
| 34 || May 8 || @ Braves || 5–2 || Ortiz (4–2) || Chacón (4–2) || Smoltz (15) || 22,829 || 16–18
|- align="center" bgcolor="ffbbbb"
| 35 || May 9 || @ Marlins || 5–4 || Looper (3–1) || Speier (2–1) || || 10,272 || 16–19
|- align="center" bgcolor="bbffbb"
| 36 || May 10 || @ Marlins || 5–4 || Jennings (3–3) || Tejera (0–1) || Jiménez (8) || 16,543 || 17–19
|- align="center" bgcolor="ffbbbb"
| 37 || May 11 || @ Marlins || 7–2 || Pavano (3–4) || Cook (1–3) || || 9,205 || 17–20
|- align="center" bgcolor="ffbbbb"
| 38 || May 12 || Mets || 9–6 || Trachsel (1–2) || Young (0–1) || Benítez (12) || 25,443 || 17–21
|- align="center" bgcolor="bbffbb"
| 39 || May 13 || Mets || 9–8 || Reed (3–1) || Cerda (0–1) || Jiménez (9) || 25,043 || 18–21
|- align="center" bgcolor="bbffbb"
| 40 || May 14 || Mets || 6–5 || Reed (4–1) || Stanton (2–3) || Jiménez (10) || 26,755 || 19–21
|- align="center" bgcolor="bbffbb"
| 41 || May 15 || Expos || 4–2 || Jones (1–1) || Tucker (0–1) || Jiménez (11) || 23,197 || 20–21
|- align="center" bgcolor="ffbbbb"
| 42 || May 16 || Expos || 4–1  || Ayala (3–1) || Cruz (3–4) || Biddle (11) || 27,117 || 20–22
|- align="center" bgcolor="ffbbbb"
| 43 || May 17 || Expos || 6–4 (10) || Ayala (4–1) || Jones (1–2) || Biddle (12) || 30,052 || 20–23
|- align="center" bgcolor="bbffbb"
| 44 || May 18 || Expos || 4–0 || Chacón (5–2) || Ohka (3–5) || || 30,720 || 21–23
|- align="center" bgcolor="ffbbbb"
| 45 || May 20 || @ Dodgers || 3–1 || Brown (5–1) || Oliver (1–3) || Gagné (16) || 27,251 || 21–24
|- align="center" bgcolor="ffbbbb"
| 46 || May 21 || @ Dodgers || 3–2 || Ishii (4–1) || Jennings (3–4) || Gagné (17) || 25,332 || 21–25
|- align="center" bgcolor="ffbbbb"
| 47 || May 22 || @ Dodgers || 4–3 || Dreifort (4–3) || Cook (1–4) || Gagné (18) || 27,461 || 21–26
|- align="center" bgcolor="bbffbb"
| 48 || May 23 || Giants || 10–7 || Chacón (6–2) || Moss (5–3) || || 30,043 || 22–26
|- align="center" bgcolor="ffbbbb"
| 49 || May 24 || Giants || 5–1 || Ainsworth (4–4) || Elarton (0–1) || || 31,475je || 22–27
|- align="center" bgcolor="bbffbb"
| 50 || May 25 || Giants || 5–1 || Oliver (2–3) || Foppert (2–4) || || 33,723 || 23–27
|- align="center" bgcolor="bbffbb"
| 51 || May 26 || Giants || 12–7 || Fuentes (1–0) || Nathan (5–2) || || 28,340 || 24–27
|- align="center" bgcolor="bbffbb"
| 52 || May 27 || Dodgers || 7–3 || Cook (2–4) || Ishii (4–2) || || 26,465 || 25–27
|- align="center" bgcolor="bbffbb"
| 53 || May 28 || Dodgers || 6–0 || Chacón (7–2) || Dreifort (4–4) || || 27,108 || 26–27
|- align="center" bgcolor="bbffbb"
| 54 || May 29 || Dodgers || 12–5 || Elarton (1–1) || Pérez (4–3) || || 27,007 || 27–27
|- align="center" bgcolor="ffbbbb"
| 55 || May 30 || @ Giants || 6–2 || Ainsworth (5–4) || Oliver (2–4) || || 38,439 || 27–28
|- align="center" bgcolor="ffbbbb"
| 56 || May 31 || @ Giants || 2–1 || Foppert (3–4) || Jennings (3–5) || Worrell (14) || 40,256 || 27–29
|-

|-  bgcolor="ffbbbb"
|- align="center" bgcolor="ffbbbb"
| 57 || June 1 || @ Giants || 4–0 || Rueter (6–1) || Cook (2–5) || || 41,404 || 27–30
|- align="center" bgcolor="bbffbb"
| 58 || June 2 || @ Giants || 4–1 || Chacón (8–2) || Schmidt (4–2) || Jiménez (12) || 34,231 || 28–30
|- align="center" bgcolor="bbffbb"
| 59 || June 3 || Indians || 7–3 || Elarton (2–1) || Rodríguez (3–6) || || 22,326 || 29–30
|- align="center" bgcolor="bbffbb"
| 60 || June 4 || Indians || 2–1 || Oliver (3–4) || Traber (2–3) || Jiménez (13) || 22,222 || 30–30
|- align="center" bgcolor="bbffbb"
| 61 || June 5 || Indians || 7–4 || Jennings (4–5) || Sabathia (4–3) || Jiménez (14) || 25,221 || 31–30
|- align="center" bgcolor="ffbbbb"
| 62 || June 7 || Royals || 13–11 || George (6–4) || Chacón (8–3) || MacDougal (14) || 25,421 || 31–31
|- align="center" bgcolor="ffbbbb"
| 63 || June 7 || Royals || 9–5 || Gilfillan (1–0) || Jones (1–3) || || 26,435 || 31–32
|- align="center" bgcolor="bbffbb"
| 64 || June 8 || Royals || 8–7 || Elarton (3–1) || DeHart (0–2) || Jiménez (15) || 30,084 || 32–32
|- align="center" bgcolor="bbffbb"
| 65 || June 10 || @ Twins || 5–0 || Jennings (5–5) || Radke (5–6) || || 18,886 || 33–32
|- align="center" bgcolor="ffbbbb"
| 66 || June 11 || @ Twins || 7–4 || Lohse (6–4) || Cook (2–6) || Guardado (18) || 17,942 || 33–33
|- align="center" bgcolor="ffbbbb"
| 67 || June 12 || @ Twins || 15–3 || Rogers (5–2) || Oliver (3–5) || || 18,003 || 33–34
|- align="center" bgcolor="bbffbb"
| 68 || June 13 || @ Tigers || 7–2 || Chacón (9–3) || Cornejo (3–4) || || 19,212 || 34–34
|- align="center" bgcolor="ffbbbb"
| 69 || June 14 || @ Tigers || 9–7 || Ledezma (2–2) || Elarton (3–2) || Spurling (3) || 19,260 || 34–35
|- align="center" bgcolor="bbffbb"
| 70 || June 15 || @ Tigers || 5–4 || Jennings (6–5) || Knotts (2–5) || Jiménez (16) || 19,323 || 35–35
|- align="center" bgcolor="ffbbbb"
| 71 || June 16 || Padres || 7–5 || Witasick (1–1) || Jiménez (0–3) || Beck (2) || 22,716 || 35–36
|- align="center" bgcolor="ffbbbb"
| 72 || June 17 || Padres || 4–3 (8) || Peavy (6–5) || Neagle (0–1) || Witasick (1) || 22,178 || 35–37
|- align="center" bgcolor="bbffbb"
| 73 || June 18 || Padres || 5–3 || Chacón (10–3) || Jarvis (0–1) || Speier (1) || 22,033 || 36–37
|- align="center" bgcolor="bbffbb"
| 74 || June 19 || Padres || 10–5 || Oliver (4–5) || Lawrence (4–8) || || 23,515 || 37–37
|- align="center" bgcolor="ffbbbb"
| 75 || June 20 || Tigers || 7–5 || Maroth (2–11) || Elarton (3–3) || || 29,603 || 37–38
|- align="center" bgcolor="bbffbb"
| 76 || June 21 || Tigers || 9–6 || Jennings (7–5) || Sparks (0–4) || || 35,660 || 38–38
|- align="center" bgcolor="bbffbb"
| 77 || June 22 || Tigers || 5–3  || Neagle (1–1) || Bernero (1–10) || Jiménez (17) || 34,723 || 39–38
|- align="center" bgcolor="bbffbb"
| 78 || June 23 || @ Padres || 5–1 || Chacón (11–3) || Jarvis (0–2) || || 18,072 || 40–38
|- align="center" bgcolor="bbffbb"
| 79 || June 24 || @ Padres || 5–2 || Oliver (5–5) || Lawrence (4–9) || Jiménez (18) || 15,915 || 41–38
|- align="center" bgcolor="ffbbbb"
| 80 || June 25 || @ Padres || 7–6 || Hackman (2–1) || Jones (1–4) || Beck (4) || 19,908 || 41–39
|- align="center" bgcolor="ffbbbb"
| 81 || June 27 || @ Pirates || 5–3 || Fogg (4–3) || Jennings (7–6) || Williams (21) || 37,566 || 41–40
|- align="center" bgcolor="bbffbb"
| 82 || June 28 || @ Pirates || 5–4 || Neagle (2–1) || Benson (5–8) || Jiménez (19) || 25,083 || 42–40
|- align="center" bgcolor="ffbbbb"
| 83 || June 29 || @ Pirates || 9–0 || Suppan (6–7) || Chacón (11–4) || || 20,475 || 42–41
|- align="center" bgcolor="ffbbbb"
| 84 || June 30 || Diamondbacks || 8–7 (12) || Randolph (3–0) || Jiménez (0–4) || || 33,533 || 42–42
|-

|-  bgcolor="ffbbbb"
|- align="center" bgcolor="bbffbb"
| 85 || July 1 || Diamondbacks || 7–4 || López (2–0) || Good (3–2) || Speier (2) || 25,209 || 43–42
|- align="center" bgcolor="bbffbb"
| 86 || July 2 || Diamondbacks || 6–2 || Jennings (8–6) || Patterson (1–4) || Fuentes (1) || 47,032 || 44–42
|- align="center" bgcolor="ffbbbb"
| 87 || July 3 || Diamondbacks || 8–4 || Webb (5–2) || Neagle (2–2) || || 48,560 || 44–43
|- align="center" bgcolor="bbffbb"
| 88 || July 4 || @ Brewers || 8–6 || Reed (5–1) || Estrella (2–1) || Speier (3) || 21,144 || 45–43
|- align="center" bgcolor="bbffbb"
| 89 || July 5 || @ Brewers || 9–8 || Oliver (6–5) || Ford (0–1) || Fuentes (2) || 30,731 || 46–43
|- align="center" bgcolor="ffbbbb"
| 90 || July 6 || @ Brewers || 3–1 || Sheets (7–6) || Jiménez (0–5) || DeJean (17) || 21,623 || 46–44
|- align="center" bgcolor="ffbbbb"
| 91 || July 7 || @ Diamondbacks || 14–6 || Randolph (4–0) || Cruz (3–5) || || 32,019 || 46–45
|- align="center" bgcolor="ffbbbb"
| 92 || July 8 || @ Diamondbacks || 9–3 || Webb (6–2) || Reed (5–2) || || 36,436 || 46–46
|- align="center" bgcolor="bbffbb"
| 93 || July 9 || Giants || 11–7 || Cook (3–6) || Foppert (5–8) || || 31,139 || 47–46
|- align="center" bgcolor="bbffbb"
| 94 || July 10 || Giants || 11–3 || Oliver (7–5) || Powell (0–1) || || 30,954 || 48–46
|- align="center" bgcolor="bbffbb"
| 95 || July 11 || Dodgers || 7–6 || Fuentes (2–0) || Shuey (3–2) || Speier (4) || 34,150 || 49–46
|- align="center" bgcolor="bbffbb"
| 96 || July 12 || Dodgers || 5–3 || Jennings (9–6) || Ashby (2–6) || Speier (5) || 41,696 || 50–46
|- align="center" bgcolor="ffbbbb"
| 97 || July 13 || Dodgers || 9–3 || Álvarez (1–1) || Neagle (2–3) || || 32,483 || 50–47
|- align="center" bgcolor="ffbbbb"
| 98 || July 17 || @ Giants || 8–4 || Moss (8–6) || Jennings (9–7) || || 41,052 || 50–48
|- align="center" bgcolor="ffbbbb"
| 99 || July 18 || @ Giants || 7–0 || Brower (6–2) || Oliver (7–6) || || 41,690 || 50–49
|- align="center" bgcolor="ffbbbb"
| 100 || July 19 || @ Giants || 5–3 || Schmidt (10–4) || Chacón (11–5) || Worrell (21) || 42,607 || 50–50
|- align="center" bgcolor="ffbbbb"
| 101 || July 20 || @ Giants || 8–4 || Foppert (6–8) || Neagle (2–4) || || 42,620 || 50–51
|- align="center" bgcolor="bbffbb"
| 102 || July 21 || @ Dodgers || 4–1 || Stark (1–0) || Ashby (2–7) || || 27,243 || 51–51
|- align="center" bgcolor="ffbbbb"
| 103 || July 22 || @ Dodgers || 5–2 || Nomo (11–8) || Jennings (9–8) || Gagné (34) || 30,416 || 51–52
|- align="center" bgcolor="bbffbb"
| 104 || July 23 || @ Dodgers || 8–3 || Oliver (8–6) || Ishii (9–4) || || 33,589 || 52–52
|- align="center" bgcolor="ffbbbb"
| 105 || July 24 || @ Dodgers || 1–0 (11) || Shuey (4–2) || López (2–1) || || 33,144 || 52–53
|- align="center" bgcolor="bbffbb"
| 106 || July 25 || Brewers || 7–3 || Tsao (1–0) || Obermueller (0–1) || || 39,013 || 53–53
|- align="center" bgcolor="bbffbb"
| 107 || July 26 || Brewers || 13–8 || Cook (4–6) || De Los Santos (1–3) || || 40,675 || 54–53
|- align="center" bgcolor="bbffbb"
| 108 || July 27 || Brewers || 6–1 || Jennings (10–8) || Franklin (7–7) || || 30,108 || 55–53
|- align="center" bgcolor="bbffbb"
| 109 || July 29 || @ Reds || 5–3 || Oliver (9–6) || Haynes (2–11) || Speier (6) || 25,663 || 56–53
|- align="center" bgcolor="ffbbbb"
| 110 || July 30 || @ Reds || 3–2 (10) || Reitsma (8–3) || Jiménez (0–6) || || 23,962 || 56–54
|- align="center" bgcolor="ffbbbb"
| 111 || July 31 || @ Reds || 5–4 (10) || Riedling (1–3) || Fuentes (2–1) || || 24,861 || 56–55
|-

|-  bgcolor="ffbbbb"
|- align="center" bgcolor="ffbbbb"
| 112 || August 1 || @ Pirates || 12–11 || Sánchez (1–0) || Bernero (1–13) || || 22,413 || 56–56
|- align="center" bgcolor="ffbbbb"
| 113 || August 2 || @ Pirates || 1–0 || Meadows (2–1) || Jennings (10–9) || Lincoln (4) || 37,820 || 56–57
|- align="center" bgcolor="bbffbb"
| 114 || August 3 || @ Pirates || 16–4 || Oliver (10–6) || D'Amico (6–11) || Jiménez (20) || 16,839 || 57–57
|- align="center" bgcolor="ffbbbb"
| 115 || August 5 || Phillies || 7–2 || Myers (11–6) || Chacón (11–6) || || 28,034 || 57–58
|- align="center" bgcolor="bbffbb"
| 116 || August 6 || Phillies || 5–1 || Tsao (2–0) || Duckworth (4–6) || || 27,599 || 58–58
|- align="center" bgcolor="bbffbb"
| 117 || August 7 || Phillies || 4–3 || López (3–1) || Millwood (11–8) || Speier (7) || 27,855 || 59–58
|- align="center" bgcolor="bbffbb"
| 118 || August 8 || Pirates || 13–6 || Jiménez (1–6) || Mahomes (0–1) || || 28,362 || 60–58
|- align="center" bgcolor="ffbbbb"
| 119 || August 9 || Pirates || 10–4 || D'Amico (7–11) || Oliver (10–7) || || 34,611 || 60–59
|- align="center" bgcolor="ffbbbb"
| 120 || August 10 || Pirates || 5–3 || Figueroa (1–0) || Chacón (11–7) || Lincoln (5) || 26,904 || 60–60
|- align="center" bgcolor="ffbbbb"
| 121 || August 11 || @ Expos || 3–1 || Day (6–4) || Jennings (10–10) || Biddle (28) || 6,401 || 60–61
|- align="center" bgcolor="bbffbb"
| 122 || August 12 || @ Expos || 6–3 (11) || Fuentes (3–1) || Biddle (3–5) || López (1) || 7,277 || 61–61
|- align="center" bgcolor="ffbbbb"
| 123 || August 13 || @ Expos || 6–5 || Vázquez (10–8) || Stark (1–1) || Ayala (3) || 6,724 || 61–62
|- align="center" bgcolor="ffbbbb"
| 124 || August 15 || @ Mets || 5–0 || Glavine (8–11) || Oliver (10–8) || || 28,081 || 61–63
|- align="center" bgcolor="ffbbbb"
| 125 || August 16 || @ Mets || 13–4 || Seo (6–8) || Chacón (11–8) || || 28,233 || 61–64
|- align="center" bgcolor="ffbbbb"
| 126 || August 17 || @ Mets || 6–4 || Leiter (12–6) || Jennings (10–11) || Weathers (4) || 28,393 || 61–65
|- align="center" bgcolor="ffbbbb"
| 127 || August 18 || @ Mets || 8–0 || Trachsel (12–7) || Tsao (2–1) || || 23,865 || 61–66
|- align="center" bgcolor="bbffbb"
| 128 || August 19 || Marlins || 10–2 || Stark (2–1) || Pavano (9–11) || || 25,889 || 62–66
|- align="center" bgcolor="bbffbb"
| 129 || August 20 || Marlins || 9–3 || Vance (1–0) || Redman (10–7) || || 23,534 || 63–66
|- align="center" bgcolor="bbffbb"
| 130 || August 21 || Marlins || 5–4 || Speier (3–1) || Looper (4–3) || || 23,846 || 64–66
|- align="center" bgcolor="ffbbbb"
| 131 || August 22 || Braves || 9–3 || Maddux (12–10) || Jennings (10–12) || || 35,578 || 64–67
|- align="center" bgcolor="ffbbbb"
| 132 || August 23 || Braves || 5–4 || Hampton (12–5) || Tsao (2–2) || Smoltz (44) || 42,303 || 64–68
|- align="center" bgcolor="ffbbbb"
| 133 || August 24 || Braves || 12–6 || Ortiz (18–5) || Stark (2–2) || || 31,227 || 64–69
|- align="center" bgcolor="ffbbbb"
| 134 || August 26 || Giants || 3–1 || Schmidt (13–5) || Oliver (10–9) || Worrell (28) || 24,100 || 64–70
|- align="center" bgcolor="ffbbbb"
| 135 || August 27 || Giants || 6–4 || Ponson (16–9) || Jiménez (1–7) || Worrell (29) || 24,972 || 64–71
|- align="center" bgcolor="bbffbb"
| 136 || August 28 || Giants || 6–1 || Jennings (11–12) || Correia (1–1) || || 23,645 || 65–71
|- align="center" bgcolor="ffbbbb"
| 137 || August 29 || @ Dodgers || 6–4 || Brown (13–7) || Vance (1–1) || Gagné (45) || 39,092 || 65–72
|- align="center" bgcolor="ffbbbb"
| 138 || August 30 || @ Dodgers || 5–0 || Mota (4–2) || Stark (2–3) || || 35,136 || 65–73
|- align="center" bgcolor="ffbbbb"
| 139 || August 31 || @ Dodgers || 3–0 || Pérez (11–10) || Oliver (10–10) || Gagné (46) || 41,146 || 65–74
|-

|-  bgcolor="ffbbbb"
|- align="center" bgcolor="ffbbbb"
| 140 || September 2 || @ Giants || 2–1 || Herges (3–2) || Bernero (1–14) || Worrel (33) || 39,419 || 65–75
|- align="center" bgcolor="ffbbbb"
| 141 || September 3 || @ Giants || 7–6 || Nathan (9–3) || Fuentes (3–2) || || 38,490 || 65–76
|- align="center" bgcolor="ffbbbb"
| 142 || September 5 || Dodgers || 8–7 || Mota (5–2) || Reed (5–3) || Gagné (48) || 26,828 || 65–77
|- align="center" bgcolor="ffbbbb"
| 143 || September 6 || Dodgers || 10–2 || Pérez (12–10) || Oliver (10–11) || || 24,393 || 65–78
|- align="center" bgcolor="ffbbbb"
| 144 || September 7 || Dodgers || 6–2 || Álvarez (4–1) || Jiménez (1–8) || Gagné (49) || 24,553 || 65–79
|- align="center" bgcolor="bbffbb"
| 145 || September 9 || @ Cardinals || 8–1 || Jennings (12–12) || Haren (3–6) || || 27,591 || 66–79
|- align="center" bgcolor="ffbbbb"
| 146 || September 10 || @ Cardinals || 10–2 || Tomko (12–8) || Elarton (3–4) || || 25,396 || 66–80
|- align="center" bgcolor="bbffbb"
| 147 || September 11 || @ Cardinals || 9–4 || Oliver (11–11) || Hitchcock (3–4) || || 28,801 || 67–80
|- align="center" bgcolor="bbffbb"
| 148 || September 12 || @ Diamondbacks || 8–2 || Jiménez (2–8) || Dessens (7–8) || || 32,922 || 68–80
|- align="center" bgcolor="ffbbbb"
| 149 || September 13 || @ Diamondbacks || 16–6 || Batista (10–8) || Young (0–2) || || 37,139 || 68–81
|- align="center" bgcolor="ffbbbb"
| 150 || September 14 || @ Diamondbacks || 5–0 || Johnson (5–8) || Jennings (12–13) || || 35,153 || 68–82
|- align="center" bgcolor="ffbbbb"
| 151 || September 16 || Astros || 14–4 || Robertson (15–7) || Tsao (2–3) || || 22,328 || 68–83
|- align="center" bgcolor="bbffbb"
| 152 || September 17 || Astros || 7–5 || Oliver (12–11) || Villone (6–5) || Speier (8) || 22,454 || 69–83
|- align="center" bgcolor="ffbbbb"
| 153 || September 18 || Astros || 6–0 || Miller (14–12) || Jiménez (2–9) || || 21,718 || 69–84
|- align="center" bgcolor="bbffbb"
| 154 || September 19 || Padres || 6–5 || Elarton (4–4) || Howard (1–3) || Fuentes (3) || 31,976 || 70–84
|- align="center" bgcolor="ffbbbb"
| 155 || September 20 || Padres || 11–3 || Lawrence (9–15) || Vance (1–2) || || 28,028 || 70–85
|- align="center" bgcolor="bbffbb"
| 156 || September 21 || Padres || 5–3 || Tsao (3–3) || Eaton (8–12) || Fuentes (4) || 28,167 || 71–85
|- align="center" bgcolor="bbffbb"
| 157 || September 23 || Diamondbacks || 20–9 || Oliver (13–11) || Webb (10–8) || || 22,686 || 72–85
|- align="center" bgcolor="ffbbbb"
| 158 || September 24 || Diamondbacks || 6–3 || Johnson (6–8) || Jiménez (2–10) || Mantei (27) || 24,465 || 72–86
|- align="center" bgcolor="ffbbbb"
| 159 || September 25 || Diamondbacks || 8–7 || Villarreal (10–7) || Fuentes (3–3) || Mantei (28) || 23,056 || 72–87
|- align="center" bgcolor="ffbbbb"
| 160 || September 26 || @ Padres || 5–0 || Eaton (9–12) || Vance (1–3) || || 45,588 || 72–88
|- align="center" bgcolor="bbffbb"
| 161 || September 27 || @ Padres || 10–2 || Stark (3–3) || Bynum (1–4) || || 42,479 || 73–88
|- align="center" bgcolor="bbffbb"
| 162 || September 28 || @ Padres || 10–8 || López (4–1) || Witasick (3–7) || Speier (9) || 60,988 || 74–88
|-

Player stats

Batting

Starters by position 
Note: Pos = Position; G = Games played; AB = At bats; H = Hits; Avg. = Batting average; HR = Home runs; RBI = Runs batted in

Other batters 
Note: G = Games played; AB = At bats; H = Hits; Avg. = Batting average; HR = Home runs; RBI = Runs batted in

Pitching

Starting pitchers 
Note: G = Games pitched; IP = Innings pitched; W = Wins; L = Losses; ERA = Earned run average; SO = Strikeouts

Other pitchers 
Note: G = Games pitched; IP = Innings pitched; W = Wins; L = Losses; ERA = Earned run average; SO = Strikeouts

Relief pitchers 
Note: G = Games pitched; W = Wins; L = Losses; SV = Saves; ERA = Earned run average; SO = Strikeouts

Farm system

References

External links
2003 Colorado Rockies at Baseball Reference
2003 Colorado Rockies team page at www.baseball-almanac.com

Colorado Rockies seasons
Colorado Rockies season
Colorado Rockies
2000s in Denver